Manzonia lusitanica is a species of minute sea snail, a marine gastropod mollusk or micromollusk in the family Rissoidae.

Description

Distribution
Gorringe seamount, endemic, moderately common in 96-485 m depth.

References

lusitanica
Molluscs of the Atlantic Ocean
Gastropods described in 2007